Serhiy Hryhorovych Kachkarov (16 September 1948 – 7 August 2011) was a professional Ukrainian football coach. 

In 1990s he served as a head coach of the Ukraine women's national football team.

References

External links

1948 births
2011 deaths
Ukrainian football managers
FC CSKA Kyiv managers
WFC Donchanka Donetsk managers
WFC Arena Kyiv managers
Ukraine women's national football team managers